Excoecaria oppositifolia, an understory and evergreen tree species, belongs to the genus Excoecaria of the family Euphorbiaceae. It is found in Western Ghats of India and Sri Lanka. Unisexual flowers are dioecious and inflorescence depends on the type of flower. Male flowers are axillary spikes and female flowers are axillary racemes.

References

Further reading
India biodiversity

External links
 Improved access to highly unsaturated skin irritants of the daphnane type from latex of Excoecaria oppositifolia.
FDA Poisonous Plant Database

oppositifolia
Flora of Asia
Flora of Sri Lanka
Dioecious plants